The Utah Southern Railroad Depot, located at 225 East State Street in Lehi, Utah, United States was built in c.1873.  It has also been known as Oregon Short Line Railroad Depot, as Los Angeles & Salt Lake Railroad Depot, and as Union Pacific Railroad Depot. All of these names refer to railroad companies that were subsidiaries or acquisitions of the Union Pacific Railroad that used this depot. It was listed on the National Register of Historic Places (NRHP) in 1994.

Description
The depot is a plain two-story wooden structure, but as of its NRHP nomination, it was significant as "one of only two remaining depots from the earliest decade of Utah's railroad history. In operation as a railroad depot for 100 years (it closed in 1973), the depot also served as a telegraph office and dancehall." It is "the second oldest standing depot west of the Mississippi [River]".

See also

 National Register of Historic Places listings in Utah County, Utah
 Utah Southern Railroad (1871–81)
 Los Angeles and Salt Lake Railroad
 Oregon Short Line

References

External links

 Virtual Tour: Lehi Railroad Depot Museum
 Utah Southern Railroad Depot - Lehi, Utah - Waymarking

Railway stations on the National Register of Historic Places in Utah
Railway stations in the United States opened in 1873
Buildings and structures in Lehi, Utah
Union Pacific Railroad stations in Utah
Museums in Utah County, Utah
Former railway stations in Utah County, Utah
National Register of Historic Places in Utah County, Utah
1873 establishments in Utah Territory
Oregon Short Line Railroad
Los Angeles and Salt Lake Railroad